

List of Ambassadors

Yoram Elron
Irit Lillian 2015 - 2019 
Shaul Raz Kasima 2012 - 2015
Noah Gal Gendler 2006 - 2011
Avi Sharon (diplomat) 2002 - 2006
Emanuel Zisman 2000 - 2002
David Cohen (diplomat) 1996 - 2000
Avi Sharon 1993 - 1996
Meir Joffe 1990 - 1993
Victor Eliachar 1967
Minister Zvi Avnon 1961 - 1967
Natan Peled Envoy to Bulgaria, 1958-1960

References 

Bulgaria
Israel